Lataxiena cumella is a species of sea snail, a marine gastropod mollusk in the family Muricidae, the murex snails or rock snails.

Description

Distribution
This marine species occurs off the Philippines.

References

 Jousseaume, F., 1898. Description de coquilles nouvelles. Le Naturaliste 12(2) no 276: 201

External links
 MNHN, Paris:syntype
 Sowerby, G. B., III. (1900). Descriptions of new species of marine Mollusca collected by the late Otto Koch at the Island of Cebu, Philippines. Proceedings of the Malacological Society of London. 4(3): 126–129, pl. 11

cumella
Gastropods described in 1898